Sone Ki Lanka ( Island of Gold) is a 1992 Hindi-language action film, produced by Rajendra Patel on R.S.Films banner and directed by Ajay Kashyap. Starring Jeetendra, Jayapradha, Chunky Pandey, Varsha Usgaonkar  and music composed by Anand–Milind.

Plot
Mohit (Jeetendra) and Rohit (Chunkey Pandey) attain their youth while working in a motor garage right from their childhood. Each one of them is prepared to lay his life for the other if time demands so. The uppermost aspiration of Rohit's life is to become a multi-millionaire. In order to achieve this, he entices Romu (Varsha Usgaonkar) into the nest of his love, but this dream is shattered to smithereens when he finds out that Romu is poor as himself and is also nursing the same desire as his own. On the other hand, Mohit has a burning desire to grind Kamal Rai (Sadashiv Amprapurkar) to dust because he had taken over entire wealth of Mohit's father after murdering and is enjoying it unlawfully. During Mohit's revengeful pursuit he is joined by Vinny (Shakti Kapoor) and Reema Devi (Reema Lagoo) who are victims of Kamal Rai's villainy. Now the density plays its hand Kamal Rai is reunite this entire wealth is the sole aim of Mohit's life. To achieve this, he successfully wins the heart of Tejal (Jaya Prada) who is the daughter of Kamal Rai. Rohit becomes a formidable obstacle between the two lovers & wants to eliminate Mohit. During this tense drama of vengeance, Vinny gets killed at the hands of Rohit and Mohit kills Romu.

Cast
 Jeetendra as Mohit
 Jayapradha as Tejal
 Chunky Pandey as Rohit
 Varsha Usgaonkar as Romu / Ram Pyari
 Shakti Kapoor as Vinny
 Satyendra Kapoor as Madhav
 Sadashiv Amrapurkar as Kamal Rai
 Pankaj Dheer as Naughty
 Reema Lagoo as Reema Devi
 Aparajita
 Kunika as Mala

Soundtrack

References

1990s Hindi-language films
Films scored by Anand–Milind